1551 Argelander, provisional designation , is a background asteroid from the inner regions of the asteroid belt, approximately  in diameter. It was discovered on 24 February 1938, by Finnish astronomer Yrjö Väisälä at the Turku Observatory in southwest Finland. The likely S-type asteroid has a rotation period of 4.1 hours. It was named after German astronomer Friedrich Argelander.

Orbit and classification 

Argelander is a non-family asteroid from the main belt's background population. It orbits the Sun in the inner main-belt at a distance of 2.2–2.6 AU once every 3 years and 9 months (1,353 days; semi-major axis of 2.39 AU). Its orbit has an eccentricity of 0.07 and an inclination of 4° with respect to the ecliptic.

Naming 

This minor planet was named after Friedrich Wilhelm Argelander (1799–1875), author of the famous Bonner Durchmusterung and 19th-century head of the ancient observatory at Turku and Bonn . The official  was published by the Minor Planet Center on 30 January 1964. The lunar crater Argelander is also named after him.

Physical characteristics 

Argelander is an assumed S-type asteroid.

Rotation period and poles 

In August 2017, a rotational lightcurve of Argelander was obtained from photometric observations at the Chilean Cerro Tololo Inter-American Observatory using the SARA South Telescope. Lightcurve analysis gave a rotation period of  hours and a brightness variation of 0.48 magnitude.

A modeled lightcurve using photometric data from the Lowell Photometric Database was published in 2016. It gave a concurring period of  hours, as well as two spin axes at (3.0°, −81.0°) and (183.0°, −72.0°) in ecliptic coordinates (λ, β).

Diameter and albedo 

According to the surveys carried out by the Japanese Akari satellite and the NEOWISE mission of NASA's Wide-field Infrared Survey Explorer, Argelander measures between 9.2 and 11.0 kilometers in diameter and its surface has an albedo between 0.19 and 0.30. The Collaborative Asteroid Lightcurve Link assumes a standard albedo for a stony asteroid of 0.20 and calculates a diameter of 9.60 kilometers based on an absolute magnitude of 12.45.

References

External links 
 Asteroid Lightcurve Database (LCDB), query form (info )
 Dictionary of Minor Planet Names, Google books
 Discovery Circumstances: Numbered Minor Planets (1)-(5000) – Minor Planet Center
 
 

001551
Discoveries by Yrjö Väisälä
Named minor planets
19380224